József Soproni may refer to:
 József Soproni (footballer) (1913–2000), Hungarian footballer
 József Soproni (composer) (1930–2021), Hungarian composer